"Clappers" is a hip hop song by American rapper Wale, released as the third single from his third studio album The Gifted. The song features Nicki Minaj and Juicy J, is produced by Kane Beatz, Mark Henry Beats, No Credit and Juicy J, and samples the Experience Unlimited song "Da Butt". The song was released on September 3, 2013

Music video
The music video was directed by Benny Boom and premiered on September 3, 2013.

Remix 
On February 3, 2014, the official remix was released, featuring Rick Ross, Fat Trel and Young Thug. The remix also features a new beat produced by Hit-Boy.

Chart performance

Release history

References

2013 singles
2013 songs
Wale (rapper) songs
Nicki Minaj songs
Juicy J songs
Maybach Music Group singles
Atlantic Records singles
Songs written by Nicki Minaj
Songs written by Kane Beatz
Songs written by Wale (rapper)
Songs written by Juicy J
Song recordings produced by Kane Beatz
Music videos directed by Benny Boom